Mallory is an English surname and given name.

Mallory may also refer to:

Places
Mallory, Minnesota
Mallory, West Virginia
Mallory Park, a motor racing circuit in Leicestershire, England
Mallory Square, a public square in Key West, Florida, United States
Mallory Township, Clayton County, Iowa

Other uses
Mallory (novel), a 1950 novel by James Hadley Chase
Mallory (Sliders), a character in the TV series Sliders
Mallory body, an inclusion found in the cytoplasm of liver cells
P. R. Mallory and Co Inc, a producer of dry battery cells that was the predecessor to Duracell
Mallory, a fictional, placeholder name for a malicious attacker in computer security and cryptographic discussions; see Alice and Bob

See also
List of places named Mallory, a list of places categorized by region and fictional places
List of places named Mallory (historical), a list of historical places named Mallory which no longer exist or are known by other names